Bert Savoy (7 January 1876 or 1888 – 26 June 1923), born Everett McKenzie, was an American entertainer who specialized in cross-dressing as a vaudeville act. His comedic skits contributed to popular culture with phrases such as "You slay me" and "You don't know the half of it."

Biography 
Savoy often partnered with Jay Brennan on Broadway. Playbill lists Savoy and Brennan appearing on Broadway in Miss 1917, Ziegfeld Follies 1918, The Greenwich Village Follies of 1920 and The Greenwich Follies of 1922. Savoy's drag queen mannerisms were an inspiration for Mae West. Savoy was a rival of sorts to the more famous Julian Eltinge, and his star was on the rise when he was struck and killed by lightning while on the beach at Fire Island, New York. There are several reports of his last words, one being that after a clap of thunder, he said "Mercy, ain't Miss God cutting up something awful?"

Savoy was the subject of an abstract painting by Charles Demuth, part of a series of abstract, "poster portraits" of friends and acquaintances of the artist, the most famous being I Saw the Figure 5 in Gold. The painting Calla Lilies (Bert Savoy) makes coded references to Savoy's death and life: the wave, seashell and calla lilies to his death, but the flowers also having a well-known symbolism representing sexual orientations, such as bisexuality and homosexuality.

See also
Julian Eltinge
Bothwell Browne
Karyl Norman

References

External links

Savoy in dress as a Lillian Russell

19th-century births
1923 deaths
Accidental deaths in New York (state)
American drag queens
American male stage actors
Deaths from lightning strikes
LGBT male actors
Vaudeville performers